Diaporthe citri is a plant pathogen infecting citruses.

References

Fungal citrus diseases
citri
Fungi described in 1887